Juan Maqueda may refer to:

 Juan José Maqueda (born 1969), Spanish footballer and manager
 Juan Carlos Maqueda (born 1949), Argentine lawyer, politician and judge